Özlem Kaya (born Özlem Baykız, February 25, 1992) is a Turkish female Paralympic swimmer. She competes in the disability category of S6 in breaststroke, butterfly and freestyle. She competed in the 2012 and 2016 Summer Paralympics.

Personal history
Özlem Baykız was born in Kahramanmaraş on February 25, 1992. She is of short stature by birth defect. On December 6, 2012, she married Bayram Kaya, and changed her surname to her spouse's.

Swimming career
Özlem had a secluded life in her childhood. She did not leave her home until she was discovered for swimming by Osman Çullu. and She began with swimming in 2004. She internationally debuted  at the 2006 IPC Swimming World Championships held in Durban, Republic of South Africa. She won her first medal, a bronze in the 100m Breaststroke SB6 event at the 2011 IPC Swimming European Championships in Berlin, Germany. She was qualified for the 2012 Summer Paralympics, and represented her country in London, United Kingdom. Kaya participated at the 2016 Summer Paralympics in Rio de Janeiro, Brazil. She took part at the World Championships in 3006, 3010, 3015 and competed at European Championships in 2011, 2014,  2016.

Kaya's disability swimming classification is S6 according to her short stature by birth defect.

Achievements

References

Living people
1992 births
Sportspeople from Kahramanmaraş
Sportswomen with disabilities
Paralympic swimmers of Turkey
S6-classified Paralympic swimmers
Swimmers at the 2016 Summer Paralympics
Turkish female breaststroke swimmers
Turkish female butterfly swimmers
Turkish female freestyle swimmers
Istanbul Büyükşehir Belediyespor athletes
Swimmers with dwarfism
Medalists at the World Para Swimming European Championships
Swimmers at the 2013 Mediterranean Games
Mediterranean Games competitors for Turkey
21st-century Turkish sportswomen
Swimmers at the 2012 Summer Paralympics